KMIS may refer to:

 KMIS (AM), a radio station (1050 AM) licensed to serve Portageville, Missouri, United States
 KMIS-FM, a radio station (103.9 FM) licensed to serve Gideon, Missouri
 KMIS-Knowledge Management Information System, BPM Software, Mexico City